Naticarius onca is a species of predatory sea snail, a marine gastropod mollusk in the family Naticidae, the moon snails.

Description

Distribution
The species is known to occur in the Red Sea and in the Indo-Pacific off Aldabra, Madagascar, Mascarene Basin, Mauritius, Mozambique and Tanzania

References

 Dautzenberg, Ph. (1929). Mollusques testacés marins de Madagascar. Faune des Colonies Francaises, Tome III
 Drivas, J. & M. Jay (1988). Coquillages de La Réunion et de l'île Maurice
 Hollman M. (2008) Naticidae. In Poppe G.T. (ed.) Philippine marine mollusks, vol. 1: 482-501, pls 186-195. Hackenheim: Conchbooks.

External links
 Kabat A.R. (2000) Results of the Rumphius Biohistorical Expedition to Ambon (1990). Part 10. Mollusca, Gastropoda, Naticidae. Zoologische Mededelingen 73(25): 345-380

Naticidae
Gastropods described in 1798